Camberwell Grammar School is an independent, single sex, Anglican primary and secondary day school for boys, located in Canterbury, an eastern suburb of Melbourne, Victoria, Australia.

Camberwell Church of England Grammar School was founded in 1886. In its early years, the school was housed at a number of sites in and around the suburb of Camberwell, Victoria. It has occupied its present site on Mont Albert Road on Canterbury's Golden Mile, since 1935.

The school currently has approximately 1,300 students. The school is divided into three sections; Junior School (pre Prep – Year 5), Middle School (Year 6 – Year 8) and Senior School (Year 9 – Year 12).

Headmasters 
There have been a total of nine headmasters of Camberwell Grammar School since the school was established in 1886. The current headmaster of Camberwell Grammar is Dr Paul Hicks (since 2005).

Curriculum 
Camberwell Grammar offers the Victorian Certificate of Education (VCE) to all of their Year 11 and 12 students, as well as allowing some students to partake in some VCE and VET 1 & 2 units in Year 10 as part of advanced programs.

Extra-curricular activities
 Australian Army Cadets: The Camberwell Grammar School Army Cadet Unit (CGSACU) was established in 1888 and celebrated its 130th anniversary in 2018
 Interschool Debating
 Rotary Interact Club
 Towards2050, school sustainability group

Music 
Alongside having a large variety of stringed, brass and combined ensembles for various different proficiencies and age groups, Camberwell Grammar also has the Music Academy program, which replicates various elements of the Music Conservatorium model in order to support musicians throughout their musical journey during and after school.

Sport 
Camberwell Grammar is a member of the Associated Grammar Schools of Victoria (AGSV).

AGSV premierships 
Camberwell Grammar has won the following AGSV premierships.

 Athletics (11) - 1920, 1971, 1973, 1974, 1975, 1976, 1977, 1978, 1979, 1980, 2022
 Badminton (20) - 1996, 1998, 1999, 2000, 2003, 2004, 2005, 2006, 2007, 2008, 2010, 2011, 2012, 2014, 2015, 2016, 2017, 2018, 2019, 2021
 Cricket (10) - 1921, 1943, 1944, 1945, 1961, 1977, 1982, 1993, 1994, 2002
 Football - 1933
 Hockey (21) - 1991, 1993, 1994, 1995, 1996, 1997, 1999, 2000, 2001, 2002, 2003, 2004, 2005, 2006, 2010, 2011, 2012, 2013, 2014, 2018, 2021
 Squash - 2007
 Swimming (4) - 1944, 1961, 2021, 2022
 Table Tennis (20) - 1995, 1996, 1997, 1998, 1999, 2000, 2002, 2005, 2009, 2010, 2011, 2012, 2013, 2015, 2016, 2017, 2018, 2019, 2020, 2022, 2023
 Tennis (13) - 1925, 1926, 1930, 1939, 1940, 1942, 1975, 1978, 1986, 1988, 1994, 2021, 2022
 Volleyball - 1991
 Water-Polo - 2022

Old Camberwell Grammarians

 Wayne Arthurs (1988 leaver, represented Australia in the 2004 Olympics tennis team)
 Clive Baillieu, the 1st Baron Ballieu KBE, CMG (1889-1967), Australian-British rower, businessman and public servant (1907 leaver) 
 Charles Barber (1908 leaver, Military Cross for service in WWI)
 David Bridie (1980 leaver, seven time ARIA award-winning songwriter and composer)
 Darren Chau (writer, performer, producer, television executive). 
 Simon Chesterman (1990 leaver, Dean of Law at the National University of Singapore)
 Josh Daicos (2016 leaver, Australian Rules footballer)
 Nick Daicos- AFL Footballer
 David de Kretser AC KStJ (1956 leaver, born 1939, former Governor of Victoria) 
 Keith Dodgshun (1912 leaver, Honourable, Deputy Premier of Victoria 1950–1952)
 Rob Gell (1970 leaver, born 1952, geomorphologist and television weather man)
 Sam Gibson (2004 leaver, born 1986, Australian Rules footballer)
 Ashley Gilbertson (1995 leaver, photo journalist)
 Kym Gyngell (1970 leaver, born 1952, actor and comedian)
 Greg Ham (1971 leaver, 1953–2012, musician in the band Men at Work and actor)
 Cameron Hepburn (1993 leaver, Professor of Economics)
 Dan Houston (2015 leaver, Australian Rules footballer)
 Paul Hudson (1988 leaver, Australian Rules footballer for Hawthorn Football Club)
 Barry Humphries AO CBE (1951 leaver, born 1934, also educated at Melbourne Grammar School, known for the characters Dame Edna Everage and Sir Les Patterson) 
 Adrian Jackson (2001 leaver) - Not to be confused with the 1971 leaver and former Army Officer of the same name.
 Andy Lee (1999 leaver, born 1981, television and radio personality, captain of music and sport 1999)
 Jonathan Little (1983 leaver)
 Robert A. Little (1914 leaver, 1895–1918, World War I flying ace) 
 Randolph Lycett (1904 leaver, champion tennis player) 
 Cameron Macaulay (1974 leaver, Honourable Justice)
 Andrew McFarlane (1969 leaver, born 1951, actor)
 Russell Morris (1979 leaver, Australian Rules Hawthorn player) 
 Sir Walter Logie Forbes Murdoch (1891 leaver, 1874–1970, academic, former Chancellor of the University of Western Australia, great uncle of Rupert Murdoch )
 Sir Keith Murdoch (1901 leaver, 1886–1952, journalist, father of Rupert Murdoch).
 George Reid (1922 leaver, Honourable Sir)
 Tim Schenken (about 1961 leaver)
 Ken Slater (1941 leaver, 1924–1963, Australian Rules footballer and tennis player)
 Henry Douglas Stephens (1895 leaver, 1877–1952, pediatric surgeon) 
 Greg Strachan (1975 leaver, born 1958, Australian Rules footballer).
 Lindsay Urwin (1972 leaver, born 1956, Bishop and leading member of the Anglican Church)
 George Alan Vasey (1895–1945, Major General) – Also attended: Wesley College, Melbourne
 Tony Wilson (1990 leaver, author and broadcaster)

See also

 List of schools in Victoria
 List of high schools in Melbourne
 List of Anglican schools in Australia

References

External links
 Camberwell Grammar School Website
 Old Grammarian's Association Website

Anglican primary schools in Melbourne
Anglican secondary schools in Melbourne
Associated Grammar Schools of Victoria
Educational institutions established in 1886
Member schools of the Headmasters' and Headmistresses' Conference
Boys' schools in Victoria (Australia)
Junior School Heads Association of Australia Member Schools
1886 establishments in Australia
Buildings and structures in the City of Boroondara